Jan Altink (21 October 1885 – 6 December 1971) was a Dutch expressionist painter and cofounder of De Ploeg.

Life 
Jan Altink was born on 21 October 1885 in Groningen in the Netherlands.

He studied at the Kunstnijverheidsschool (circa 1900) and Academie Minerva (circa 1911). In 1918, he was a cofounder of the artists' association and movement De Ploeg. It was named in reference to breaking new ground.

Altink's work was included in the 1939 exhibition and sale Onze Kunst van Heden (Our Art of Today) at the Rijksmuseum in Amsterdam.

Altink died, at the age of 86, in the city of Groningen on 6 December 1971.

Work 
Auction house Christie's described Altink as being "widely regarded as the purest 'Groninger' of all Ploeg artists".

After studying paintings alleged to be the work of Altink, Dutch art expert Milko den Leeuw testified in a forgery case that the pictological “handwriting” of some works that had been contributed to him did not match his other paintings, but were a perfect match for those produced by an accused forger, the Dutch painter and art collector Cor van Loenen, under his own name.

References

 Christie's, "Jan Altink: Sunflowers: Lot Notes" (artist description in auction lot)
 Groninger Museum, "De Ploeg" (history of the movement and Altink's role)

External links
 8 in "Jan Altink" at Galeries.nl
 10 in "Jan Altink lots" at Christie's
 10 in "Jan Altink auctions" at Artfact.com
 Jan Altink artworks (paintings, watercolours, drawings), biography, information and signatures

1885 births
1971 deaths
Painters from Groningen
20th-century Dutch painters
Dutch male painters
20th-century Dutch male artists